Toonagh is a village in County Clare, Ireland.

Location

Toonagh is located between Corofin and Ennis.
It is in the civil parish of Dysart which is in the barony of Inchiquin.

Toonagh Hall
The hall in Toonagh was built in 1971. It was built by the local branch of Dysart Muintir na Tire. The hall covers the playground of the old school.

Handball
The Toonagh handball alley was built in 1975. It is a 40x20 court. The Handball World Championships were held in Ireland in 1994 and Toonagh was one of the venues used. The local Toonagh team have won titles in both the All-Ireland and Munster competitions.

Notable people
 Cyril Lyons, former Irish hurler and manager

References

Towns and villages in County Clare